William da Silva or William Silva may refer to:
 William Silva (volleyball) (born 1954), Brazilian volleyball player
 William Fernando da Silva (born 1986), Brazilian footballer
 William Amendoim (William das Graças Silva Jr., born 1987),  Brazilian footballer
 William Henrique Rodrigues da Silva, (born 1992) Brazilian footballer
 William Matheus da Silva (born 1990), Brazilian footballer
 William Soares da Silva (born 1988), Brazilian footballer, known as "Soares"
 William da Silva Barbosa (born 1978), Brazilian footballer
 William Posey Silva (1859 – 1948), American painter

Willian da Silva or Willian Silva may refer to:
 Willian Borges da Silva (born 1988), Brazilian footballer
 Willian José da Silva (born 1991), Brazilian footballer
 Willyan da Silva Barbosa (born 1994), Brazilian footballer

See also
 José Willams da Silva Mendonça (born 1983), Brazilian footballer, known as "Willams"
 William de Silva (1908–1988), Ceylonese politician
 William Silvers, American painter and illustrator
 William (name)
 Silva (surname)